HMS Hilary may refer to one of the following Royal Navy ships, both of which were Booth Steamship Company passenger liners requisitioned by the Royal Navy:

 , a converted to an armed merchant cruiser during World War I and sunk by the German submarine  on 25 May 1917.
 , requisitioned during World War II for use as a boarding vessel. Returned to merchant service only to be recommissioned again as an infantry landing ship/headquarters ship and used in the Sicily and Normandy landings.

References

Royal Navy ship names